Natalia Ananjeva (Russian: Наталья Ананьева, born January 5, 1946) is a Russian herpetologist, zoologist, and a specialist in taxonomy, phylogeny, the biogeography of Eurasian reptiles and amphibians, and the conservation of their biodiversity.

Biography 
Natalia Ananjeva was born in Leningrad on January 5, 1946, to the family of Professor Boris Gerasimovich Ananjeva, a psychologist. In 1968, after graduating from Leningrad University, she entered the graduate school of the Zoological Institute of the Academy of Sciences of the Soviet Union. Three years later, she joined the ornithology and herpetology laboratory staff as a junior researcher. In 1993, after defending her doctoral thesis, she became a leading researcher. Since 1996, Ananjeva has served as head of the laboratory of ornithology and herpetology at the Russian Academy of Sciences. From 2006 to 2017, she also served as Deputy Director of Research at the Zoological Institute of the RAS.

Named species 
As of 2021, Ananjeva has taken part in the description of 21 reptile species:

 Acanthosaura brachypoda
 Acanthosaura prasina
 Calamaria concolor
 Colubroelaps nguyenvansangi
 Cophotis dumbara
 Cyrtodactylus caovansungi
 Cyrtodactylus chauquangensis
 Cyrtopodion belaense
 Cyrtopodion golubevi
 Cyrtopodion persepolense
 Diploderma menghaiense
 Diploderma ngoclinense
 Phrynocephalus ahvazicus
 Phrynocephalus sakoi
 Pseudocalotes ziegleri
 Pseudocophotis kontumensis
 Pseudotrapelus aqabensis
 Pseudotrapelus chlodnickii
 Pseudotrapelus jensvindumi
 Scincella darevskii
 Teratoscincus mesriensis

Species named after 

 Kurixalus ananjevae
 Phrynocephalus ananjevae
 Ptyodactylus ananjevae
 Acanthosaura nataliae

References

Russian herpetologists
1946 births
Living people
Russian Academy of Sciences
Women herpetologists
20th-century Russian women scientists
Scientists from Saint Petersburg
21st-century Russian women scientists
20th-century Russian zoologists
21st-century Russian zoologists